The Silverton Wind Farm is a 199 megawatt wind farm situated on the Barrier Ranges in New South Wales, built for AGL Energy by CATCON and General Electric.

On 3 June 2009, the project was approved by the NSW state Government.

The project was initially set to begin construction in the first half of 2010, yet several issues caused delays. To begin, the transmission line needed to connect the fully developed wind farm would need to be as long as 300 km, and due to multiple connection options, as well as an expected large cost of the infrastructure, the decision of the final solution was delayed. 

In 2012, the start-date for construction of the wind farm has been pushed back to 2014, after AGL Energy decided to give priority to building two solar photovoltaic plants which have received almost A$200m in government funding.

The project's planning approval was set to expire on 24 May 2016, however AGL submitted a Modification Application on 25 February 2016 with the sole aim to extend the project's Planning Approval expiry to 2021. On 3 June 2016 that application was granted, giving AGL the option to optimise and build the project within its Powering Australian Renewables Fund. The project secured a Power Purchase Agreement with EnergyAustralia for supply of 60% of its annual output until December 2030.

On 16 May 2017, AGL announced construction had commenced.

As of 2019, it had been completed and is now operating. The project uses General Electric 3.43-130 wind turbines with a hub height of 110m. It is expected to operate at a capacity factor of 44.7%, generating 780 GWh of energy annually.

Operations 
The wind farm began grid output in May 2018 and was fully commissioned in May 2020 following long setbacks due to grid issues. These problems are reflected in the energy generation until then, with the plant being constrained during the day reducing its capacity factor. The generation table uses eljmkt nemlog to obtain generation values for each month.

Note: Asterisk indicates power output was limited during the month.

See also

Silverton, New South Wales

References

External links
 
 Project factsheet and milestone tracker

Proposed wind farms in Australia
Wind farms in New South Wales